Enpocket was a global mobile media company providing integrated entertainment and mobile marketing services. The company was founded in 2001, headquartered in Boston, Massachusetts. Nokia acquired the company in 2007 and merged it into its Services division as Nokia Interactive Advertising. In November 2009 the business unit was moved to Nokia's NAVTEQ subsidiary and renamed to NAVTEQ Media Solutions, while the creative services team left to form Movement, a mobile marketing agency based in London.

Solutions include:
Enpocket Platform: a mobile campaign management and delivery system combining multi-modal mechanics, including SMS, MMS, WAP advertising, and video with predictive analytics
Enpocket Mechanics: used by advertisers to lead consumers to store, to sell tickets, to offer ring tones and wallpapers, to offer discount coupons, and to show video of a product in action
Enpocket Network: provides brands to reach audience.

References

External links
 Nokia Interactive Advertising

Mobile content